Chañaral is a small coastal city and commune in the Atacama Region, Chile and capital of the Chañaral Province. It is largely unknown by tourists, who generally head straight for towns such as San Pedro de Atacama. The town has no high rise buildings. On the arid hills nearby is a lighthouse which casts a beam over the town during the night.  Throughout the day and night, there is a lively atmosphere on the narrow streets. Despite it being coastal, it is not a typical seaside resort, partly because the ocean is contaminated by the copper mining industry. Situated a short distance to the north is the Pan de Azúcar National Park.

History
In 1824, Diego de Almeyda discovered large natural deposits of copper in the area, and was the first in the mining industry in Chile to export it. For this reason, the town was founded in October 26,1833 as Chañaral de las Ánimas ("Chañar field of the Souls"). A few years later, Pedro Lujan discovered ore at El Salado, where a mine was built. In 1836, a shipping port promising raw material was constructed. The great boom Chañaral began in 1860 when A. Edwards & Company was settled where an inn exists today.

Demographics
Of these, 13,180 (97.3%) lived in urban areas and 363 (2.7%) in rural areas. The population fell by 2.8% (393 persons) between the 1992 and 2002 censuses.

The demonym for a person from Chañaral is Chañaralino for a man and Chañaralina for a woman.

Administration
As a commune, Chañaral is a third-level administrative division of Chile administered by a municipal council, headed by an alcalde who is directly elected every four years. The 2008-2012 alcalde was Hector Volta Rojas (PRSD), and the council has the following members:
 Carmen Rojas Cornejo (RN)
 Isabel Ogalde Álvarez (PS)
 Margarita Flores Salazar (PRSD)
 Mary Álamos Gutiérrez (PDC)
 Mery Schampke Galleguillos (PPD)
 Omar Monroy López (PRI)

Within the electoral divisions of Chile, Chañaral is represented in the Chamber of Deputies by Lautaro Carmona (PC) and Carlos Vilches (UDI) as part of the 5th electoral district, (together with Diego de Almagro and Copiapó). The commune is represented in the Senate by Isabel Allende Bussi (PS) and Baldo Prokurica Prokurica (RN) as part of the 3rd senatorial constituency (Atacama).

References

External links
  Municipality of Chañaral

Communes of Chile
Port settlements in Chile
Populated places established in 1833
Populated places in Chañaral Province
Capitals of Chilean provinces
1833 establishments in Chile
Coasts of Atacama Region